Idaho Legislative District 6 is one of 35 districts of the Idaho Legislature. It is currently represented by Dan Johnson, Republican  of Lewiston and Mike Kingsley, Republican of Lewiston. Aaron von Ehlinger also represented the seat until his resignation on June 29, 2021.

District profile (1992–2002) 
From 1992 to 2002, District 6 consisted of a portion of Nez Perce County.

District profile (2002–2012) 
From 2002 to 2012, District 6 consisted of Latah County.

District profile (2012–2022) 
District 6 currently consists of Nez Perce and Lewis Counties.

District profile (2022–) 
In December 2022, District 6 will consist of Latah and Lewis Counties and portion of Nez Perce County.

See also

 List of Idaho Senators
 List of Idaho State Representatives

References

External links
Idaho Legislative District Map (with members)
Idaho Legislature (official site)

06
Nez Perce County, Idaho
Lewis County, Idaho